Robert L. Meeks (born February 3, 1934) is an American former politician from the state of Indiana. A Republican, he served in the Indiana State Senate from 1988 to 2008.

References

Living people
1934 births
Republican Party Indiana state senators
Politicians from Fort Wayne, Indiana